The 2019 AIHL season is the 20th season of the Australian Ice Hockey League (AIHL). It ran from 20 April 2019 until 25 August 2019, with the Goodall Cup finals following on 31 August and 1 September 2019. The CBR Brave won the H Newman Reid Trophy after finishing the regular season with the most points in league history for the second time. The Sydney Bears won the Goodall Cup for the third time by defeating the Perth Thunder in the final.

Teams
In 2019 the AIHL had 8 teams competing in the league.

League business
In January the Newcastle Northstars signed a three-year naming rights deal with Newcastle Rescue and Consultancy. Proski, the former naming rights holder, will continue to sponsor the club at a lower level. In March the Newcastle Northstars unveiled a new red-coloured third jersey design featuring an alternative logo. The logo is made up an upper-case letter N on top of a five pointed star. On 19 March the Adelaide Adrenaline signed a naming rights deal with Agile Group. The deal starts in the 2019 season and runs through to the end of the 2021 season. On 28 March it was announced that the CBR Brave had been acquired by the Canberra Cavalry, a baseball team that plays in the Australian Baseball League. Cavalry management took over operations of the Brave immediately while full ownership is expected to be transferred later in the year. 3 April 2019, O’Brien Group announced the completion of upgrades to their Melbourne stadium including 1,361 solar panels, two water tanks and an environmentally-friendly heating system. The new facilities would generate 400kW of power, providing a 25% saving on the stadium's power bill. To mark the completion of the new upgrades the stadium was renamed O’Brien Icehouse, invoking and recognising the stadium's original name. On 19 April the CBR Brave signed a naming rights deal with the Signal Co. Wireless for the 2019 season. The deal increases The Signal Co. Wireless' level of sponsorship having been a major sponsor in 2018. On 31 May it was announced that the Melbourne Mustangs had signed an affiliation with the Melbourne Chargers of the Australian Women's Tier 2 Show Case Series, Australia's second highest women's ice hockey league.

Exhibition games
On 30 and 31 March the Melbourne Ice hosted Hockey X 2019 at the O'Brien Icehouse. Hockey X, previously known as the Hockey Festival, included the CBR Brave, Melbourne Ice, Melbourne Mustangs and an All-Star team from Queensland. Day one of the festival saw each team compete in a round-robin competition to determine the playoff spots on day two. The Melbourne Mustangs finished the round-robin at the top of the standings, three points ahead of the Melbourne Ice. The CBR Brave finished in third and the Queensland All-Stars in last place. Day two included two games, a final between first and second and a placement game for third place. The Melbourne Mustangs defeated the Melbourne Ice 3–1 in the final to claim the Warrior Cup, while the CBR Brave beat the Queensland All-Stars 3–0 to finish third. On 13 April the Melbourne Ice and Melbourne Mustangs held their annual exhibition match at the O'Brien Icehouse. The Mustangs defeated the Ice 4–2. On the same day the Adelaide Adrenaline held an exhibition game against a South Australian All Stars team which the Adrenaline won 4–3. The following day the Newcastle Northstars held a practice match against their affiliate club, the Newcastle North Stars ECSL at the Hunter Ice Skating Stadium. The Northstars won the match 10–2.

Personnel changes
On 23 November the Melbourne Ice announced the signing of Johan Steenberg to the position of Director of Operations. Steenberg returns to the Ice after a year with the CBR Brave where he acted as their Director of Player Development and Player Personnel. Steenberg was previously the Ice's goaltender coach from 2014 to 2017. The following month the Melbourne Ice appointed Australian men's national team head coach Brad Vigon to the position of head coach. Vigon replaces interim head coach Sandy Gardner who had been in the role since June 2018. Gardner was subsequently appointed an assistant coach role along with Brent Laver and Glen Mayer Laver moves into the role having been the development coach for the last two seasons and Mayer was previously an assistant coach at the Ice from 2014 to 2016. On 7 December the AIHL announced that Rob Bannerman had stepped down as commissioner due to a career move in the United States. Bannerman had been in the position for the past six years. In March the Melbourne Ice appointed Mark Smith to the position of general manager. Smith is currently head coach of the Melbourne Ice Women's team. On 28 February the Newcastle Northstars announced the signing of John Kennedy as head coach following his retirement as a player. Kennedy will be assisted by associated coaches Joe Theriault and Ray Sheffield. On 10 April the CBR Brave announced the signing of former Ligue Magnus player Max Ross to the position of assistant coach.

Player transfers

Interclub transfers

* Mid-season transfer.

Retirements

New signings

Players lost

Regular season
The regular season began on 20 April 2019 and will run through to 25 August 2019 before the top four teams advance to compete in the Goodall Cup playoff series.

Results

Fixtures

April

May

June

July

August

Standings

Source

Skater statistics
2019 AIHL season top-ten lists for the following four skater statistical categories: Points, Goals, Assists and Penalty minutes.

Goaltender statistics

2019 AIHL season top-ten lists for the following two goaltender statistical categories: Goals against average and Save percentage

Season awards

Below lists the 2019 AIHL regular season award winners.

Source

Goodall Cup playoffs
The 2019 playoffs are scheduled to begin on 31 August with the Goodall Cup final held on 1 September. Following the end of the regular season the top four teams advance to the playoff series which is to be held at the Hunter Ice Skating Stadium in Newcastle, New South Wales. The series is a single game elimination with the two winning semi-finalists advancing to the Goodall Cup final.

All times are UTC+10:00

Semi-finals

Final

All-Star weekend
The 2019 AIHL All-Star Weekend was held at the International Convention Centre Sydney on 14 and 15 June 2019. The format of the weekend is unchanged from 2018 with a skills competition on 14 June and an all-stars game on 15 June. The teams however were re-aligned on a north–south basis. Team North included players from the CBR Brave, Newcastle Northstars, Sydney Bears and Sydney Ice Dogs. Team South included players from the Adelaide Adrenaline, Melbourne Ice, Melbourne Mustangs and Perth Thunder. Sydney Bears' Michael Schlamp and Perth Thunder's Jamie Woodman were initially announced as the team captains for Team North and Team South respectively. Schlamp was later replaced by Brian Funes of the Sydney Bears due to injury. The Sydney Bears' Ron Kuprowsky was named as Team North coach and Perth Thunder's David Ruck as coach of Team South. The weekend ran alongside the 2019 Ice Hockey Classic, an exhibition series featuring players from Canada and the United States.

The skills competition, originally organised for Friday 14 June was cancelled along with the Ice Hockey Classic match between the United States and Canada. As such, a cut down version of the skills competition involving just two of the originally planned events was contested on Saturday 15 June before the start of the 2019 All-Stars match. Jesse Gabrielle of the CBR Brave won the fastest skater competition. Danick Gauthier of the Sydney Bears won the hardest shot competition. Team North defeated Team South 11–9 in the All-Stars match and Perth Thunder's Keven Veilleux claimed the Mick McCormack Cup after being named the most valuable player.

Skills competition
Fastest Skater: Jesse Gabrielle (CBR Brave) - 12.97 seconds
Hardest Shot: Danick Gauthier (Sydney Bears)

All-star game

References

External links
The Australian Ice Hockey League

2019 in ice hockey
2019 in Australian sport
2019